Ferdinando Bruno, O.F.M. (1593-1648) was a Roman Catholic prelate who served as Bishop of Lacedonia (1625–1648).

Biography
Giacomo Candido was born in Florence, Italy in 1593.
On 6 October 1625, he was appointed during the papacy of Pope Urban VIII as Bishop of Lacedonia.
On 28 October 1625, he was consecrated bishop by Ottavio Bandini, Cardinal-Bishop of Porto e Santa Rufina. 
He served as Bishop of Lacedonia until his death in 1648.

References

External links and additional sources
 (for Chronology of Bishops)
 (for Chronology of Bishops) 

17th-century Italian Roman Catholic bishops
Bishops appointed by Pope Urban VIII
1593 births
1648 deaths
Clergy from Florence
Franciscan bishops